Mustafa Özcan Güneşdoğdu is a Qur'an reciter of Turkish descent. Born in 1970 in Çankırı, Turkey, he currently lives in Germany. His Call to Prayer (Adhan) was featured on the accompanying CD for the book Approaching the Qur'an, written by Michael Sells.

Mustafa has also won the Qur'an recitation competition in Saudi-Arabia, 1991. He is also a singer of nasheed.

See also 
Quran
Qirat
Tajweed

External links
A Feature Conversation between Kemal Ayyildiz and Mustafa Ozcan Gunesdogdu

Turkish Muslims
Turkish emigrants to Germany
Living people
1970 births